pkg-config is a computer program that defines and supports a unified interface for querying installed libraries for the purpose of compiling software that depends on them. It allows programmers and installation scripts to work without explicit knowledge of detailed library path information.  pkg-config was originally designed for Linux, but it is now also available for BSD, Microsoft Windows, macOS, and Solaris.

It outputs various information about installed libraries. This information may include:
 Parameters (flags) for C or C++ compiler
 Parameters (flags) for linker
 Version of the package in question

The first implementation was written in shell. Later, it was rewritten in C using the GLib library.

Synopsis 
When a library is installed (automatically through the use of an RPM, deb, or other binary packaging system or by compiling from the source), a .pc file should be included and placed into a directory with other .pc files (the exact directory is dependent upon the system and outlined in the pkg-config man page). This file has several entries.

These entries typically contain a list of dependent libraries that programs using the package also need to compile. Entries also typically include the location of header files, version information and a description.

Here is an example .pc file for libpng:
prefix=/usr/local
exec_prefix=${prefix}
libdir=${exec_prefix}/lib
includedir=${exec_prefix}/include
 
Name: libpng
Description: Loads and saves PNG files
Version: 1.2.8
Libs: -L${libdir} -lpng12 -lz
Cflags: -I${includedir}/libpng12
This file demonstrates how libpng informs that its libraries can be found in /usr/local/lib and its headers in /usr/local/include, that the library name is libpng, and that the version is 1.2.8. It also gives the additional linker flags that are needed to compile code that uses this library.

Here is an example of usage of pkg-config while compiling:
$ gcc -o test test.c $(pkg-config --libs --cflags libpng)

pkg-config can be used by build automation software such as CMake.

Comparison with libtool 

GNU Libtool is an alternative solution for managing the paths, dependencies, and required flags when linking to a library.  There are a few differences in the approach taken:

 pkg-config needs to be invoked explicitly for each dependency, while libtool wraps the call to the compiler.
 pkg-config has the --static option to distinguish between static and dynamic linking, for a static build the complete list of dependencies is passed to the compiler.  libtool does not distinguish between static and dynamic linking, always passing the complete list of dependencies.
 libtool is only useful if both the application and the library are built using libtool, while library written in any language can ship a .pc file.
 pkg-config relies on the library search path, while libtool references libraries by their absolute path.  This causes build failures with libtool when, for example, a library is moved from /lib to /usr/lib.

Alternative implementations 
 pkgconf – Implementation of pkg-config without depending on GLib

 PkgConfig – Pure-Perl Core-Only replacement for pkg-config
 ruby-gnome/pkg-config – Implementation of pkg-config in Ruby

References

External links 
 pkg-config home at freedesktop.org
 
 

Computer libraries
Freedesktop.org
Linux configuration utilities